This is a list of breweries in Texas.

Breweries and microbreweries

Former breweries

 These breweries were housed in the same physical brewery building at 3300 Church Street in Galveston.
 These breweries were housed in the same physical brewery building at 303 Pearl Parkway in San Antonio.

See also 
 Beer in the United States
 Microbrewery

References

External links
 Texas breweries directory

Texas
Breweries